Stan Getz in Stockholm is an album by saxophonist Stan Getz, recorded in Sweden in 1955 and first released on the Verve label.

Reception
The AllMusic review awarded the album 3½ stars, stating: "Getz's lyricism is at a peak here. He can solo right inside the melody with his phrasing, yet accent the actual songs these tunes were taken from. This is top-notch Getz all the way through."

Track listing
 "Indiana" (Ballard MacDonald, James F. Hanley) - 4:54 		
 "Without a Song" (Vincent Youmans, Billy Rose, Edward Eliscu) - 4:42
 "I Don't Stand a Ghost of a Chance with You" (Victor Young, Ned Washington, Bing Crosby) - 5:53
 "I Can't Believe That You're in Love with Me" (Jimmy McHugh, Clarence Gaskill) - 5:22
 "Everything Happens to Me" (Tom Adair, Matt Dennis) - 7:11
 "Over the Rainbow" (Harold Arlen. Yip Harburg) - 5:26
 "Get Happy" (Arlen, Ted Koehler) - 5:15
 "Jeepers Creepers" (Harry Warren, Johnny Mercer) - 5:02

Personnel 
Stan Getz - tenor saxophone
Bengt Hallberg - piano
Gunnar Johnson - bass
Anders Burman - drums

References 

1956 albums
Stan Getz albums
albums produced by Norman Granz
Verve Records albums